The 2013 Copa do Brasil (officially the 2013 Copa Perdigão do Brasil for sponsorship reasons) was the 25th edition of the Copa do Brasil. It began on February 27 and ended on November 27. The competition was contested by 87 teams, either qualified through participating in their respective state championships (71), by the CBF Rankings (10) or those qualified for 2013 Copa Libertadores (6). Clubs that qualify for the 2013 Copa Libertadores entered the competition in the Round of 16. The best 8 teams of 2012 Campeonato Brasileiro eliminated up to the third round qualifies for 2013 Copa Sudamericana which was contested in the second half of 2013.

Format
The competition is a single elimination knockout tournament featuring two-legged ties. In the first two rounds, if the away team wins the first match by 2 or more goals, it progresses straight to the next round avoiding the second leg. The away goals rule is also used in the Copa do Brasil. The winner qualifies for the 2014 Copa Libertadores.

Qualified teams
Teams in bold qualified for 2013 Copa Libertadores and entered directly in the Round of 16.

Notes
Minas Gerais (MG): Formerly known as Ipatinga FC until 2012.
Paraíba (PB): Originally, CSP had qualified as 2012 Copa Paraíba champion, but the team was disqualified by the Brazilian Superior Court of Sports Justice (STJD) and replaced by Sousa.
São Paulo (SP): São Paulo qualified to 2013 Copa Sudamericana as 2012 Copa Sudamericana champions. CBF announced that Vasco da Gama (2012 Série A 5th) entered in his berth due to scheduling conflicts.

Preliminary round

|}

First leg

Second leg

First round

|}

First leg

Second leg

Second round

|}
Note 1: Naviraiense won on aggregate but was disqualified by the STJD after being punished for fielding an ineligible player.

First leg

Second leg

Third round

|}

First leg

Second leg

Final rounds 
A draw by CBF scheduled for August 6 set the matches for this round. The 16 qualified teams were divided in two pots. Teams from pot 1 are the ones who competed at the 2013 Copa Libertadores (except São Paulo, replaced by Vasco da Gama) plus the two highest CBF ranked teams qualified via the Third Round. Pot 2 is composed of the other teams that qualified through the Third Round.

Qualified teams

Bracket 
Teams that play in their home stadium in the first leg are marked with †.

Round of 16 

|}

First leg

Second leg

Quarterfinals 

|}

First leg

Second leg

Semifinals 

|}

First leg

Second leg

Finals 

|}

First leg

Second leg

Copa Sudamericana qualification
The best eight teams eliminated before the Round of 16 with the best 2012 Série A or 2012 Série B record qualifies for 2013 Copa Sudamericana.

References

External links
Copa Perdigão do Brasil
Copa do Brasil 2013, CBF.com
Copa do Brasil, Soccerway.com

Copa do Brasil seasons
2013 in Brazilian football
2013 domestic association football cups